Damian O'Brien (born 1980) is an Irish Gaelic footballer who played as a left corner-forward for the Tipperary senior team.

Born in Donohill, County Tipperary, O'Brien first arrived on the inter-county scene at the age of seventeen when he first linked up with the Tipperary minor team before later joining the under-21 and junior sides. He joined the senior panel during the 2000 championship. O'Brien later became a regular member of the starting fifteen and has won one Tommy Murphy Cup medal.

At club level O'Brian plays with Éire Óg Annacarty.

O'Brien retired from inter-county football following the conclusion of the 2010 championship.

References

1980 births
Living people
Éire Óg Annacarty Gaelic footballers
Tipperary inter-county Gaelic footballers
Gaelic football managers